Losillasaurus (meaning "Losilla lizard") is a genus of sauropod dinosaur from the Late Jurassic and possibly Early Cretaceous (Kimmeridgian-?Berriasian) in the southeast of Spain. The type species of the turiasaurian Losillasaurus giganteus was discovered in the Villar del Arzobispo Formation in Valencia and formally described by Casanovas, Santafé and Sanz in 2001. The holotype material is from a subadult and includes part of a skull; complete cervical, dorsal, sacral, and caudal vertebrae as well as several fragments; skeletal elements from the limbs including a humerus, ulna, radius, and metacarpal; sternal plates; and from the pelvis: the ilium, ischium, and pubis. The genus is characterized by the dimension and shape of the neural spine of the proximal caudal vertebrae.

Description 
Several specimens of L. gianteus were described in 2019 and 2020 - one such specimen (SNH 180) consists of a single anterior caudal vertebra, while another (the holotype) consists of a partial skull with teeth and partial postcranial skeleton. According to Rafael Royo-Torres et al., the specimen helps scientists to understand tooth variation, allows the positioning of isolated heart-shaped teeth in the skull and demonstrates heterodonty in Turiasauria.

References 

Turiasauria
Kimmeridgian life
Late Jurassic dinosaurs of Europe
Jurassic Spain
Fossils of Spain
Fossil taxa described in 2001